Nicola Jayne Starkey is a New Zealand psychology academic. She is currently a full professor at the University of Waikato.

Academic career

After a 2000 PhD titled  'Ethological and pharmacological examination of social behaviour in gerbils (meriones unguicalatus) '  at the University of Leeds, she moved to the University of Waikato, rising to full professor.

Starkey's research includes traumatic brain injury, strokes and driver behaviour.

Selected works 
 Feigin, Valery L., Alice Theadom, Suzanne Barker-Collo, Nicola J. Starkey, Kathryn McPherson, Michael Kahan, Anthony Dowell et al. "Incidence of traumatic brain injury in New Zealand: a population-based study." The Lancet Neurology 12, no. 1 (2013): 53–64.
 Drew, Margaret, Lynette J. Tippett, Nicola J. Starkey, and Robert B. Isler. "Executive dysfunction and cognitive impairment in a large community-based sample with Multiple Sclerosis from New Zealand: a descriptive study." Archives of Clinical Neuropsychology 23, no. 1 (2008): 1–19.
 Bradley, B. F., N. J. Starkey, S. L. Brown, and R. W. Lea. "Anxiolytic effects of Lavandula angustifolia odour on the Mongolian gerbil elevated plus maze." Journal of Ethnopharmacology 111, no. 3 (2007): 517–525.
 Johnston, Marnie, Mary Foster, Jeannette Shennan, Nicola J. Starkey, and Anders Johnson. "The effectiveness of an acceptance and commitment therapy self-help intervention for chronic pain." The Clinical Journal of Pain 26, no. 5 (2010): 393–402.
 Feigin, Valery L., Suzanne Barker-Collo, Rita Krishnamurthi, Alice Theadom, and Nicola Starkey. "Epidemiology of ischaemic stroke and traumatic brain injury." Best Practice & Research Clinical Anaesthesiology 24, no. 4 (2010): 485–494.

References

External links
  
 
 

Living people
Year of birth missing (living people)
New Zealand women academics
Alumni of the University of Leeds
Academic staff of the University of Waikato
New Zealand psychologists
New Zealand women psychologists
New Zealand medical researchers